Osdorfer Born is a major estate of prefabricated houses in the Osdorf and Lurup quarters of Hamburg, Germany. It is named after a small stream flowing into the Düpenau stream.

History
The major settlement with 5,000 flats for 12,000 people, including some high rises, had been planned since 1963 and was erected from 1966 to 1971. Next to Steilshoop and Mümmelmannsberg, Osdorfer Born belonged to the first major settlements (lit. translation of "Großsiedlungen") of the city. The 21-floor high rise at the street of Achtern Born was dubbed "Affenfelsen" (lit. "Monkey Rock", because of the similarity to a constructed rock in Hagenbeck's Tierpark).

In the center of the settlement, the mall of "Born Center" is located. Nearby, "KL!CK Kindermuseum Hamburg", a museum for children, as well as Mary Magdalene church can be found. In 2002, the highest graffito of the world also was recorded at a wall at Osdorfer Born with a height of 43 m.

Osdorfer Born was often described as "deprived area" or "social hotspot" (German: "sozialer Brennpunkt"). The proportion of welfare recipients and migrants is each about 20 percent, unemployment was rising during the 2000s. On the other hand, the district authorities recently adopted several measures to improve the quality of living and the social environment.

Notable persons
 André Trulsen, football player
 LX, rap artist

References

External links
Official Website

Housing estates in Germany
Buildings and structures in Altona, Hamburg